The 1986 Australian Rally Championship was a series of six rallying events held across Australia. It was the 19th season in the history of the competition.

Barry Lowe in the Subaru RX Turbo won the 1986 Driver's Championship. Kate Officer took out the Navigator's championship. Lowe's navigator Mark Stacey placed second as he didn't compete in the opening round.

Season review

The 19th Australian Rally Championship was held over six events across Australia, the season consisting of one event each for New South Wales, Victoria, Queensland, South Australia, Tasmania and West Australia.  The 1986 season saw Barry Lowe silence his critics by winning the ARC title for the second year in a row. It was the last season for the Group G contenders, as the 1987 championship would only be open to Group A cars. Group A cars dominated the season accounting for wins in four of the six events. Lowe only had one outright win for the season, but his consistent high placings saw him victorious at season's end.

The Rallies

The six events of the 1986 season were as follows.

Round One – The Advocate – Fairfield Stages Rally

Round Two – The Forest Rally

Round Three – Bega Rally of the Valley

Round Four – The Keema Classic Rally

Round Five – The Tile Supplies Australia Rally

Round Six – BP Visco Bright Alpine Rally

1986 Drivers and Navigators championships
Final pointscore for 1986 is as follows.

Barry Lowe – Champion Driver 1986

Kate Officer – Champion Navigator 1986

References

External links
  Results of Snowy Mountains Rally and ARC results.

Rally Championship
Rally competitions in Australia
1986 in rallying